Amy Brand (born October 20, 1962) is an American academic. Brand is the current Director and Publisher of the MIT Press, a position she assumed in July 2015. Previously, Brand served as the assistant provost of faculty appointments and information at Harvard University, and as a vice president at Digital Science.

Background 
Amy Brand grew up in the Upper West Side of Manhattan, where she attended Barnard College. She moved to Cambridge, Massachusetts, in 1985 for graduate school, and has lived mainly in the Boston area since then.

Education 
Brand received a Bachelor of Arts in linguistics from Barnard College. She graduated in 1989 with a PhD in cognitive science from the Massachusetts Institute of Technology.

Career 
Brand was a postdoctoral researcher at the Institute for Research in Cognitive Science at the University of Pennsylvania from 1989 until 1992, conducting research in child language development, but ultimately decided to switch careers and move into academic publishing. Her first position was as an acquisitions editor at Lawrence Erlbaum Associates in 1992.

In 1994, Brand joined the MIT Press as a cognitive science editor for Bradford Books, MIT Press' cognitive science imprint. She was instrumental in developing CogNet, MIT Press's digital cognitive science collection – one of the first online academic communities of its kind.

From 2000 to 2008, Brand served as CrossRef's director of business and product development. In she joined  Harvard University as the program manager of the Office for Scholarly Communication. She was later promoted to university-wide Assistant Provost for Faculty Appointments and Information. Beginning in early 2014, Brand served as VP of academic and research relations as well as vice president of North America at Digital Science.

MIT Press directorship 
After an extensive search led by a committee of both MIT-affiliates and external academic publishing experts, Brand was named director of the MIT Press in July 2015. Chris Bourg, director of the MIT Libraries, stated that Brand's “breadth of experience across many sectors of the scholarly communication system make her the ideal leader of the MIT Press at this time of tremendous change and opportunity in scholarly publishing.” As director, Brand leads the Press through all areas of development, including trade acquisition and growing MIT Press’s books and journal digital offerings.

Affiliations 
Brand currently serves on boards of several information and media organizations, including the International Science Council, Creative Commons, the Royal Society of Chemistry, the Coolidge Corner Theater Foundation. She is on the Research Data and Information Committee of the National Academies of Science, Engineering, and Medicine. She previously served on the Board on International Scientific Organizations of the National Academies of Sciences, Engineering and Medicine[8], the DuraSpace board of directors, and she chaired the academic advisory board of Altmetric, a commercial service that tracks how works of scholarship are discussed online.

Brand was executive producer of the documentary Picture a Scientist, a 2020 selection of the Tribeca Film Festival that highlights gender inequality in science.

Brand co-created the CRediT taxonomy to reliably track contributions to team-based research outputs. She was a founding member of the ORCID Board, and advises on a number of community initiatives in digital scholarship.

Awards
Brand was awarded the Laya Wiesner Community Award (2021) and the American Association for the Advancement of Science Kavli Science Journalism Gold Award (2021). In 2015,   Brand was awarded the Award for Meritorious Achievement by the  Council of Science Editors (CSE). This award is the highest given by the CSE, and is given to “a person or institution that embraces the purposes of the CSE – the improvement of scientific communication through the pursuit of high standards in all activities connected with editing.”

Publications 

 On the emergence of syntax: A crosslinguistic study

 Neuropsychological reasons for a transformational analysis of verbal passive
 Language acquisition and syntactic theory: A comparative analysis of French and English child grammars
 The acquisition of passives in Spanish and the question of A-chain maturation
 Negation and functional projections in early grammar
 Crosslinguistic evidence for functional projections in early child grammar, Language acquisition studies in generative grammar
 CrossRef turns one
 CrossRef: the reference linking backbone for scholarly electronic publication
 Metadata demystified: A guide for publishers
 Linking evolved: The future of online research.
 Publishers joining forces through CrossRef
 CrossRef and the research experience
 CrossRef Search, Serials 17 (3)
 CrossRef: beyond journal reference linking.
 CROSSREF: From linking to cross-provider search
 Mini-profile: a day in the life of a business development executive
 CrossRef: Towards the future, with T. Kumagai
 Key Issue: CrossCheck
 Encyclopedia of Library and Information Sciences
 Beyond mandate and repository, toward sustainable faculty self-archiving
 Planning and Promoting the Creation of Scientific Knowledge: Three Perspectives
 Faculty appointments and the record of scholarship
 Point of View: Faculty Appointments and the Record of Scholarship
 Credit where credit is due
 Beyond authorship: attribution, contribution, collaboration, and credit
 Publishing returns to the Academy
 Report from the "What is Publishing?"(1) Workgroup
 Demographics of scholarly publishing and communication professionals

Personal life 
Brand lives in Newton, Massachusetts, with her husband, Matthew Brand, and has three children.

References 

1962 births
Living people
Barnard College alumni
MIT School of Humanities, Arts, and Social Sciences alumni
Massachusetts Institute of Technology people
People from the Upper West Side